Bali Airport  is a public use airport located  northeast of Bali, Nord-Ouest, Cameroon.

See also
List of airports in Cameroon

References

External links 
 Airport record for Bali Airport at Landings.com

Airports in Cameroon
Northwest Region (Cameroon)